Fredrik is a masculine Germanic given name derived from the German name Friedrich or Friederich, from the Old High German fridu meaning "peace" and rîhhi meaning "ruler" or "power". It is the common form of Frederick in Norway, Finland and Sweden.  The name means "peaceful ruler" The most common variant spelling of this name is Frederik which is used in Denmark, although the English spelling Frederick is more common than either. Fredrik replaced the Anglo-Saxon name Freodheric, and has been a rare first name in England since this time.

In Sweden, Fredrik first fell into usage in the 14th century, and became increasingly common after the 18th century. It is the 19th most popular male name in Sweden and the 41st most popular in Norway. It has a name day in Sweden, on July 18. Common diminutive forms include: Fred, Frillo, Fredde, Freddy, Freddie, and Rikke.

Notable people with this name
Fredrik Bajer: winner of the Nobel Prize in 1908 for peace
Fredrik Letzler: Swedish freestyle swimmer
Freddie Ljungberg: Swedish footballer
Fredrik Lundh Sammeli (born 1977), Swedish politician
Frederik Magle: Danish composer, organist and pianist
Frederik Paludan-Müller: Danish poet
Frederik Pohl: American writer
Fredrik Reinfeldt: Swedish Prime Minister
Fredrik Skavlan: Norwegian chat show host
Frederik Stang: Norwegian politician
Fredrik Thordendal: Swedish musician
Frederick Douglass: American abolitionist
Fredrik deBoer: American academic

Other instances of this name
There have been two Kings of Sweden with this name: Fredrik I (1720-1751) and Adolf Fredrik (1751-1771)
The name Fredrik is also the basis for two European surnames:
Frisian: Vick
German, Polish: Frick
Swedish band Fredrik

Variations of this name

Male
Afrikaans: Frederik, Freek
Czech: Bedřich
Danish: Frederik / Fredrik
Dutch: Frederik
Emilian: Fedrîgh
English: Frederic / Frederick
Estonian: Priidu, Priit
French: Frédéric, Frédérick
Frisian: Freddercke, Freerk
German: Friedrich
Greek: Φρειδερίκος
Hawaiian: Peleke
Hungarian: Frigyes 
Icelandic: Friðrik
Italian: Federico
Latvian: Frīdrihs, Fricis
Polish: Fryderyk
Portuguese: Frederico
Romanian: Frederic
Slovene: Friderik
Spanish: Federico

Female
Czech: Bedřiška
Dutch: Frederika
Danish: Frederikke
English: Frederica
French: Frédérique
German: Friederike
Greek: Frideriki
Icelandic:Friðrika
Italian: Federica
Norwegian: Fredrikke
Polish: Fryderyka
Romanian: Frederica
Swedish:Fredrika, Fredrica
Spanish: Federica

References

External links 
 Behind the Name

Masculine given names
Danish masculine given names
German masculine given names
Norwegian masculine given names
Swedish masculine given names
Scandinavian masculine given names